Yetman is a Canadian surname, and may refer to:

 Patrick Yetman (born 1980), Canadian professional ice hockey player
 Rex Yetman (21st century), Canadian bluegrass musician
 David Yetman (born 1941), American academic expert on Sonora, Mexico and an Emmy award-winning media presenter on the world's deserts.

Surnames